

98001–98100 

|-bgcolor=#f2f2f2
| colspan=4 align=center | 
|}

98101–98200 

|-id=127
| 98127 Vilgusová ||  ||  (1946–2007) was a Czech illustrator of books of tales that have been published in several European countries. Her great empathy for a child's soul has resulted in her illustrations having a very positive charge of humanity. || 
|}

98201–98300 

|-bgcolor=#f2f2f2
| colspan=4 align=center | 
|}

98301–98400 

|-bgcolor=#f2f2f2
| colspan=4 align=center | 
|}

98401–98500 

|-id=494
| 98494 Marsupilami ||  || Marsupilami, comic-strip character created by the Belgian cartoonist André Franquin. A playful, gluttonous wag, the Marsupilami first appeared in January 1952 in Spirou and Fantasio magazine, where it shouted out its first "Houba!" || 
|}

98501–98600 

|-bgcolor=#f2f2f2
| colspan=4 align=center | 
|}

98601–98700 

|-bgcolor=#f2f2f2
| colspan=4 align=center | 
|}

98701–98800 

|-id=722
| 98722 Elenaumberto ||  || Elena Persichilli (born 1940) and Umberto Masi (born 1926) are the parents of the Italian discoverer, Gianluca Masi, who expresses eternal gratitude to them. This citation celebrates the great importance they had in supporting him over the last 26 years, since the beginning of his interest in astronomy, up to his professional involvement with this science. || 
|}

98801–98900 

|-id=825
| 98825 Maryellen ||  || Mary Ellen Craven, companion and partner of American astronomer Edwin E. Sheridan, who discovered this minor planet || 
|-id=866
| 98866 Giannabussolari ||  || Gianna Bussolari (born 1943) has been a beloved teacher for three decades. Mother of three, she is very much appreciated by a worldwide community of astronomers as a charming guest and hostess, deserving substantial credit for the success of several astronomical conferences organized in Padova. || 
|}

98901–99000 

|-bgcolor=#f2f2f2
| colspan=4 align=center | 
|}

References 

098001-099000